Max Rooses (10 February 1839 – 15 July 1914) was a Belgian writer, literary critic, and curator of the Plantin-Moretus Museum at Antwerp.

Rooses was born in Antwerp, and went to school there up to 1858, after which he attended the University of Liège to study Philosophy and Literature. From 1860 until 1864 he was study master at the Koninklijk Athenaeum (Royal Athenaeum) in Antwerp, and in the meantime he graduated with a degree in Literature from the University of Liège. In 1864, he became teacher of Dutch at the Royal Athenaeum of Namur, and in 1866 in Ghent. Finally on 8 July 1876 he was appointed Director of the Plantin-Moretus Museum in Antwerp.

Bibliography
 Geschiedenis der Antwerpsche schildersschole (1873) – a history of the Antwerp school of painting
 Levensschets van Jan Frans Willems (1874) – a biography of Jan Frans Willems
 Schetsenboek (1877) – sketchbook
 Over de Alpen (1880)
 Christophe Plantin (1882)
 Correspondance de Chr. Plantin (1883–1911)
 Nieuw schetsenboek (1885)
 Derde schetsenboek (1886)
 L'oeuvre de P.P. Rubens (1886–1892)
 Correspondance de Rubens et documents épistolaires concernant sa vie et ses oeuvres (1887–1909) – Rubens correspondence
 Letterkundige studiën (1894) – literary essays
 Oude en nieuwe kunst (1895–1896)
 Vijftig meesterwerken van Antoon van Dijck (1900) 
 Rubens' leven en werken (1903)
 Jordaens' leven en werken (1906)
 Le Musée Plantin-Moretus (1914)

See also
 Flemish literature

Sources
 Max Rooses
 G.J. van Bork and P.J. Verkruijsse, De Nederlandse en Vlaamse auteurs (1985)
 L. C., "Max Rooses", Burlington Magazine, Vol. 25, No. 137 (Aug., 1914): 318

1839 births
1914 deaths
Flemish writers
University of Liège alumni